The 2021 FKF President's Cup is the 65th edition of the top knockout tournament in Kenyan football. It is sponsored by Betway and known as the Betway Shield Cup for sponsorship purposes. The winner qualifies for the 2021–22 CAF Confederation Cup Preliminary round.

Round and Draw Dates
The schedule is as follows

On 26 March, 2021, the President of the Republic of Kenya announced that all sporting activities would be stopped until further notice due to the COVID - 19 Pandemic. This lockdown was lifted on 1 May, 2021. This allowed sporting activities to continue. The new schedule for the 2021 Betway Cup Fixtures were announced on 18 May, 2021 with the first match between Congo Boys and Gor Mahia  to be played on 23 May, 2021. The new schedule is as follows:

Round of 64 
The draw for the Round of 64 was held on 4th February 2021 with registration having ended on 2nd February 2021.

Round of 32 
The draw for the Round of 32 matches was held on 18 February 2021, with the matches being scheduled to take place between 17 April and 18 April 2021. However, with the country being put on lockdown, new dates of 1–3 June 2021 were set for the Round of 32 Matches.

Round of 16 
The draw for the Round of 16 matches was held on 25 May 2021, with the matches being scheduled to take place between 5 June and 6 June 2021.

Prize Fund

Notes

References

2021 in African football